Olle Martinsson (21 March 1944 – 22 February 2021) was a Swedish ski jumper. He competed in the normal hill and large hill events at the 1964 Winter Olympics.

References

External links
 

1944 births
2021 deaths
Swedish male ski jumpers
Olympic ski jumpers of Sweden
Ski jumpers at the 1964 Winter Olympics
People from Gällivare Municipality
Sportspeople from Norrbotten County